Erymophyllum is a genus of flowering plants in the family Asteraceae, endemic to Australia.

Species include:
Erymophyllum glossanthus  Paul G.Wilson
Erymophyllum hemisphaericum  Paul G.Wilson
Erymophyllum ramosum (A.Gray) Paul G.Wilson

Erymophyllum tenellum (Turcz.) Paul G.Wilson

References

Gnaphalieae
Asteraceae genera
Taxa named by Paul G. Wilson